Martin Pettersson (born January 19, 1961), is a retired ice hockey player who spent 12 seasons with Skellefteå AIK. Pettersson won a WJC gold medal in 1981.

References

1961 births
Living people
Swedish ice hockey forwards
Skellefteå AIK players